The UIC Flames baseball team is a varsity intercollegiate athletic team of the University of Illinois at Chicago in Chicago, Illinois, United States. The team is a member of the Missouri Valley Conference, which is part of the National Collegiate Athletic Association's Division I. The team plays its home games at Les Miller Field at Curtis Granderson Stadium in Chicago, Illinois. The Flames are coached by Sean McDermott.

Conference membership history 
 1949–1980: Chicagoland Collegiate Athletic Conference
 1981–1983: Independent
 1984–1994: Mid Continent Conference
 1995–2022: Horizon League
 2023–present: Missouri Valley Conference

Les Miller Field at Curtis Granderson Stadium 

Les Miller Field at Curtis Granderson Stadium is a baseball stadium on the UIC campus in Chicago, Illinois that seats 1,000 spectators and is named for Les Miller, UIC head baseball coach from 1949 to 1979, and Curtis Granderson, an alumnus of the program. During Miller's tenure, the program won over 500 games. Granderson was named conference player of the year with the Flames in 2002 and later played in Major League Baseball.

Head coaches

Awards and honors

 Over their 15 seasons in the Horizon League, 61 different Flames have been named to the all-conference first-team.

Horizon League Player of the Year

Horizon League Pitcher of the Year

Horizon League Relief Pitcher of the Year

Horizon League Coach of the Year

See also
List of NCAA Division I baseball programs

References

External links